Robertkochia marina is a Gram-negative, strictly aerobic, rod-shaped, non-spore-forming and motile bacterium from the genus of Robertkochia. Robertkochia marina has been isolated from surface seawater near the Taichung harbour in Taiwan.

References

Flavobacteria
Bacteria described in 2014